Amanita ochrophylloides is a large mushroom of the genus Amanita native to southeastern Australia.

Amanita ochrophylloides was first described by Derek Reid, head mycologist of Kew Gardens, in 1978. He noted that this mushroom differed from the related Amanita ochrophylla in the shape of its spores, as well as the remnants of the membrane across the cap. The initial collection was of mushrooms growing on rocky black soil under peppermint gums and bracken at an altitude of 850 m (2800 ft) southeast of the town of Matlock in Gippsland, Victoria.

The fruit body has a pale brown cap that is initially convex before flattening with maturity to almost flat or even depressed in the centre. It is covered in prominent small warts which are roughly cone-shaped. The gills are pale orange-yellow. The brownish-white stalk is up to 10 cm (4 in) high and 2.6 cm (1 in) wide with a prominent bulb up to 4.5 cm (1.8 in) in diameter. The ring is off white and prominent but may fall off older mushrooms. The globular spores are amyloid and measure 7–10 by 5–8 μm.

See also

List of Amanita species

References

ochrophylloides
Fungi native to Australia
Fungi described in 1978